Cercospora platanicola is a fungal plant pathogen.

References

platanicola
Fungal plant pathogens and diseases